Cameraman: The Life and Work of Jack Cardiff is a 2010 documentary film that explores the work of the cinematographer Jack Cardiff. It reviews his work and with the input of many of his contemporaries, examines his legacy as one of the most influential film makers in the world and details how he became master of the Technicolor process. The film includes interviews with Cardiff as well as Martin Scorsese, Kirk Douglas, Charlton Heston, Lauren Bacall, Kim Hunter, Kathleen Byron, John Mills, Alan Parker, Richard Fleischer and many others.

Among many anecdotes in the film, Jack Cardiff relates what it was like to work with Hollywood's greatest icons: Marilyn Monroe, Audrey Hepburn, Humphrey Bogart, Katharine Hepburn, Sophia Loren, Alfred Hitchcock, Marlene Dietrich and Arnold Schwarzenegger.

The film was released about a year after Jack Cardiff's death and was shown at the 2010 Cannes Film Festival on 16 May 2010, as part of the "Cannes Classics".

Interviews with contributors 
 Jack Cardiff
 Martin Scorsese
 Kirk Douglas
 Lauren Bacall
 Charlton Heston
 Kim Hunter
 John Mills
 Alan Parker
 Thelma Schoonmaker
 Freddie Francis
 Raffaella De Laurentiis
 Richard Fleischer
 Peter Yates
 Kathleen Byron
 Christopher Challis
 Kevin McClory
 Ian Christie
 Moira Shearer
 Peter Handford
 George E. Turner
 Michel Ciment
 Michael Powell (voice) (archive footage)

References

External links 
 
 Jack Cardiff: Painter's eye view at Variety
 Official website for the film

2010 films
2010 documentary films
British documentary films
Documentary films about cinematography
2010s English-language films
2010s British films